Gymnobathra bryaula is a moth of the family Oecophoridae. It was described by Edward Meyrick in 1905. It is endemic to New Zealand.

References

Moths described in 1905
Oecophoridae
Taxa named by Edward Meyrick
Endemic fauna of New Zealand
Endemic moths of New Zealand